King Power Stadium (also known as the Leicester City Stadium due to UEFA sponsorship regulations and formerly known as the Walkers Stadium) is a football stadium in Leicester, England. It has been the home of Premier League club Leicester City since 2002 and has an all-seated capacity of 32,261. Since 2021, the stadium has also been the primary home of Leicester City Women.

History

Background and construction
Leicester's previous stadium was at nearby Filbert Street, which had been their home since 1891. It was gradually upgraded during the 20th century and with the advent of the Taylor Report in January 1990 requiring all clubs in the top two divisions to have all-seater stadiums by August 1994, Leicester City's directors began to investigate building a new stadium during the early 1990s, but decided to take the redevelopment option by building a new stand on one side of Filbert Street and fitting seats into the remaining standing areas, giving the stadium a 21,500 all-seated capacity by the 1994–95 season.

Filbert Street's conversion to an all-seater stadium coincided with their promotion to the Premier League after a seven-year exile from the top flight, and with their relegation after just one season it appeared the 21,500 capacity would be adequate.

However, success in the late 1990s saw crowds rise, which meant virtually every game at Filbert Street was a sell-out by the end of the decade. Relocation was soon back on the cards; several clubs had relocated to new stadiums around this time, including fellow Midlands clubs Stoke City and Derby County.

Some parts of the ground – the East and North Stands in particular – were also somewhat outdated, which led the manager, Martin O'Neill to joke that when he showed Filbert Street to new signings he led them backwards out of the players tunnel to prevent them from seeing the East Stand.

In early 1998, plans were announced for a 40,000 all-seater stadium to be built at Bede Island South in time for the 2000–01 season, but they were abandoned on 5 January 2000. Chairman John Elsom vowed other options, including relocation to another site or even further redevelopment of Filbert Street, would be considered, hoping either option would have materialised by August 2002.

The relocation option was soon settled upon, as plans were unveiled on 2 November 2000 for a 32,000-seat stadium at nearby Freeman's Wharf, with 2003–04 being the expected completion date, although it was suggested at the time relocation could happen at the start of the 2002–03 season. Work on the stadium began in the summer of 2001, and by 10 October that year it was confirmed the new stadium would be ready for the 2002–03 season.

The stadium was completed on time in the summer of 2002, ready for Leicester to take up residence for the start of the 2002–03 season. However, it was not an easy start at their new stadium as they had just been relegated from the Premier League and were more than £30 million in debt. The stadium is thought to have cost around £37 million to build.

Opening
The stadium was officially opened by former Leicester striker Gary Lineker on 23 July 2002. He used a giant pair of scissors to cut a ribbon on the pitch after arriving at the stadium in a Walkers lorry. The first game at the new stadium was a friendly against Basque team Athletic Bilbao, on 4 August 2002. The game finished 1–1, with Tiko scoring the first goal at the stadium, and Jordan Stewart scoring Leicester's first goal. The attendance was approximately 24,000 (no official figure was recorded due to a computer problem). The first competitive match took place six days later and Leicester beat Watford 2–0 in front of a near-capacity crowd of 31,022. Brian Deane scored both goals, including the stadium's first in competitive games. Leicester ended the 2002–03 season promoted back to the Premier League, losing just two home games in the season, despite spending the early part of the season in receivership due to their huge debts, until a takeover deal was completed.

Ownership
The £37 million cost of the new stadium, combined with relegation from the Premiership, the collapse of the English transfer market due to the introduction of the transfer window and the collapse of ITV Digital meant Leicester went into receivership shortly after moving to the new stadium. Birse Construction who had built the stadium therefore lost a large part of their fee, and they withdrew from football ground construction.

As part of the deal which brought the club out of receivership, the stadium's ownership reverted to American academic retirement fund TIAA–CREF, who had supplied £28 million via a bond scheme towards the stadium's construction, with the club taking a long-term lease while the bond repayments were made.

On 1 March 2013, owners King Power purchased the stadium through their company K Power Holdings Co, Ltd.

Current infrastructure and plans
In 2022, the stadium became the first in Europe to operate a frictionless kiosk for food and drink purchases. In 2015, then vice-chairman Aiyawatt Srivaddhanaprabha stated plans were in place to increase the ground's capacity to around 42,000. Relocation to a new stadium has also been a consideration in the past, but the club have since decided to develop the existing site. In April 2018, it was announced that initial planning for the expansion and development of King Power Stadium was underway. On 28 July 2021, Leicester City confirmed that they would reveal plans to the public which included increasing the capacity to 40,000, as well as several development projects in the area surrounding the stadium. The club announced on 25 October 2021, that they had submitted a hybrid planning application to Leicester City Council for the redevelopment of King Power Stadium and the surrounding area. They had also applied for permits in September 2021 to begin early enabling works in preparation for the redevelopment. In September 2022, plans were approved for Leicester to extend King Power Stadium's capacity to 40,000. The other development projects were also given provisional approval.

Helicopter crash 

On 27 October 2018, Vichai Srivaddhanaprabha's helicopter crashed in a car park outside the stadium, shortly after taking off from the pitch. Four other people were on the helicopter at the time and there were no survivors.

Naming

In 2002, former Leicester City shirt sponsors Walkers signed a ten-year deal for naming rights. The agreement was superseded halfway through the period, in May 2007, when they again paid a seven-figure sum to extend their sponsorship of the stadium until 2017. Originally the stadium was to have been called the "Walkers Bowl," but the name was dropped after fans objected on the grounds the name was too "American" (referring to the American college football bowl game concept). As a result of a fans' petition, the name was quickly changed to the "Walkers Stadium"; however, some fans at the time were still unhappy the name only referenced the sponsor, with no Leicester City reference, such as "Filbert," "Fosse" or "Foxes".

Naming rights were sold to King Power for the 2011–12 season, and the ground has been known as King Power Stadium ever since. It is commonly referred to by the club and its supporters as Filbert Way after the site's address. During the 2015 Rugby World Cup, the stadium was known as the Leicester City Stadium and this is the same for UEFA competitions.

Notable games

Football
The first game at the stadium was a friendly against Spanish team Athletic Bilbao, on 4 August 2002. The game finished 1–1, with Tiko scoring the first goal at the stadium, and Jordan Stewart scoring Leicester's first goal.

During their absence from Wembley Stadium, the England national football team played a home friendly game against Serbia and Montenegro at the stadium on 3 June 2003. Goals from Steven Gerrard and Joe Cole gave England a 2–1 victory. On 12 October of the same year, the ground hosted an international friendly match between Brazil and Jamaica, with Roberto Carlos scoring the winner.

On 20 May 2006, the stadium hosted the Football Conference play-off final between Hereford United and Halifax Town. A goal in extra time gave Hereford a 3–2 win and promotion to the Football League. Nine days later, the ground was also the venue for another international friendly, with Ghana beating Jamaica 4–1.

On 12 October 2007, it hosted the 2009 UEFA European Under-21 Championship qualification Group 3 match between England's under-21s and Montenegro's under-21s. The hosts edged out the visitors 1–0 with Matt Derbyshire's goal.

On 30 July 2011, Leicester City played a strong Real Madrid side in the Npower Cup in front of 32,188 fans, with star players such as Cristiano Ronaldo and Kaká playing for Madrid. After falling behind to a first-half goal from José Callejón and a second on the hour from Karim Benzema, Sven-Göran Eriksson's men pulled a goal back a minute from the end through substitute Lloyd Dyer.

On 4 April 2014, Leicester won 2-1 against Sheffield Wednesday. The win put them on the brink of promotion back to the Premier League, and the next day their Premier League status was confirmed as results went in Leicester's favour.

On 3 May 2014, Leicester lifted the 2013–14 Championship title following a 1–0 home victory over Doncaster Rovers.

On 21 September 2014, Leicester went on to produce one of the greatest comebacks in Premier League history, as they won 5-3 against Manchester United at King Power Stadium. They came back from 3–1 down with 30 minutes left to score four goals.

On 8 August 2015, the stadium recorded what is believed to be the current highest ever league attendance. Leicester won 4–2 against Sunderland F.C in their first match of the 2015–16 Premier League season.

On 7 May 2016, Leicester City lifted the 2015–16 Premier League trophy following a 3–1 win versus Everton, less than a week after officially becoming champions as Tottenham Hotspur failed to beat Chelsea. Andrea Bocelli performed live before the match.

On 27 September 2016, the stadium hosted its first ever European football match since its opening in 2002. Leicester won 1–0 against FC Porto in the UEFA Champions League.

On 14 March 2017, at the stadium the club played its UEFA Champions League last-16 second leg fixture against Sevilla FC. The match finished 2–0 on the night, and 3–2 on aggregate which resulted in Leicester reaching the quarter-finals of the competition.

On 11 September 2018, the stadium hosted a friendly between the England national team and Switzerland. England won 1-0 with a goal from Marcus Rashford, with then Leicester left-back Ben Chilwell making his England debut as a 79th minute substitute at his home stadium.

On 30 July 2022, the stadium hosted the FA Community Shield due to Wembley Stadium hosting the final of UEFA Women's Euro 2022 on the following day. As the holders, Leicester City were invited to host. This made Leicester the only club to host this fixture at two different stadia, following Filbert Street in 1971.

International matches

Rugby union
In 2004 Leicester Tigers considered sharing the stadium with Leicester City as their own 16,815-capacity ground at Welford Road was considered too small to handle the growing popularity of rugby union. The plan would have seen the two clubs form a jointly owned company to buy the stadium from, then owners, Teachers. The deal was abandoned in 2005 as the clubs failed to fully agree terms. Because of the continued parlous state of the football club's finances, rumours groundsharing was still being discussed continued to circulate, with some suggestions Tigers were considering buying the stadium outright from Teachers. In 2007, a permanent groundshare was ruled out as Leicester Tigers received planning consent for a major expansion of their own Welford Road venue with a new 10,500-seat stand taking Welford Road to a capacity of 24,500.

However, Tigers have played six matches at the stadium The first three were either to capitalise on the larger capacity with the greater interest in high-profile games or when competition rules demanded the match be played away from their normal home ground while the other three was due to the demolition of the old Caterpillar Stand at Welford Road.

King Power Stadium has also hosted international rugby, including a match between a World XV and South Africa on 3 December 2006 to mark the centenary of the Springboks' first game abroad. South Africa won 32–7.

The stadium was a host for matches in the 2015 Rugby World Cup. The ground hosted three pool matches: Argentina–Tonga, Argentina–Namibia and Canada–Romania.

Average league and record attendances
The overall record attendance at the stadium is thought to be between 32,488-32,500, for a rugby union match between Leicester Tigers and Bath in 2006. This rugby match took place prior to seats being removed to provide segregation of rival football fans, reducing the capacity of the ground from exactly 32,500 to 32,261.

Leicester City Men
The current highest ever league attendance is thought to be 32,242, for a Premier League match against Sunderland A.F.C on 8 August 2015. The highest ever attendance for a non-competitive football match stands at 32,188, for a pre-season friendly against Real Madrid on 30 July 2011.

Leicester City Women

Notes

References

External links

 Official website

Leicester City F.C.
Sports venues in Leicester
Football in Leicestershire
Football venues in England
Rugby union stadiums in England
Premier League venues
Sports venues completed in 2002
2002 establishments in England
English Football League venues
Women's Super League venues
Leicester City W.F.C.